Tuanku Panglima Paderap, also called Panglima Deli, was the third ruler of the Deli Sultanate, now part of North Sumatra, Indonesia. He succeeded his father Tuanku Panglima Perunggit, who died around 1700. Paderap had four sons, namely Tuanku Jalaluddin (or Kejuruan Metar), Tuanku Panglima Pasutan (or Kejuruan Padang), Tuanku Tawar (or Kejuruan Santun), and Tuanku Umar (or Kejuruan Junjongan).

A power struggle happened in the Deli after Paderap died in 1720. Jalaluddin, Paderap's first son, could not replace him because of a physical disability. It was Pasutan who became the fourth ruler of Deli, while his younger brother Umar became the first ruler of the Serdang Sultanate.

Paderap was buried in Pulau Brayan district in Medan city.

See also 
 Deli Sultanate
 Serdang Sultanate

References 

18th-century monarchs in Asia
Malay people
History of Sumatra
North Sumatra
1720 deaths
Year of birth missing